Earl of Essex is a title in the Peerage of England which was first created in the 12th century by King Stephen of England. The title has been recreated eight times from its original inception, beginning with a new first Earl upon each new creation. Possibly the most well-known Earls of Essex were Thomas Cromwell (c. 14851540) (sixth creation), chief minister to King Henry VIII, and Robert Devereux, 2nd Earl of Essex (1565–1601) (eighth creation), a favourite of Queen Elizabeth I who led the Earl of Essex Rebellion in 1601.

The current holder of the earldom is Paul Capell, 11th Earl of Essex (born 1944), a retired school teacher from Caton, Lancashire.

The family seat was Cassiobury House, near Watford, Hertfordshire.

Early creations

The title was first created in the 12th century for Geoffrey de Mandeville, 1st Earl of Essex (died 1144). Upon the death of the third earl in 1189, the title became dormant or extinct. Geoffrey Fitz Peter, who had married Beatrice de Say, granddaughter of the first earl's sister and eventual heir to the Mandeville honour, gained the earldom in 1199 at its second creation by King John. The Essex title passed to two of Fitz Peter's sons before again becoming extinct upon the death of the second son, William, the 3rd Earl of Essex, who had taken the surname de Mandeville.

The third creation was for Humphrey de Bohun, 2nd Earl of Hereford in 1239, whose father Henry had married Maud, sister of the sixth earl. All three of the Earldoms of Hereford, Northampton and of Essex became extinct in 1373. There were several more creations, including one briefly for Thomas Cromwell, before the Devereux creation in 1572. Walter Devereux was the first earl of this creation; he was related to the Bourchier family who had held the honour earlier. This line continued to his son Robert Devereux, 2nd Earl of Essex (1566–1601) a favourite of Queen Elizabeth I and his son Robert Devereux, 3rd Earl of Essex, the general who commanded the Parliamentary army at the Battle of Edge Hill, the first major battle of the English Civil War (for further history of the Devereux family, see the Viscount Hereford). Upon its extinction, the present creation was made in 1661.

Capell creation

The Capell (or Capel) family descends from Sir Arthur Capell of Raines Hall in Essex and of Hadham in Hertfordshire. His grandson Arthur Capell represented Hertfordshire in both the Short and Long Parliaments. In 1641 he was raised to the Peerage of England as Baron Capell of Hadham, in the County of Hertford. Capell later fought as a Royalist in the Civil War. He was tried and condemned to death by the Parliamentarians and beheaded in May 1649. He was succeeded by his eldest son, the second Baron. In 1661 he was created Viscount Malden, in the County of Essex, and Earl of Essex, with remainder, failing heirs male of his own, to, firstly, his brother Henry Capell (later Baron Capell of Tewkesbury; see below), failing which to, secondly, his brother Edward Capell. These titles are also in the Peerage of England. Lord Essex later served as Lord-Lieutenant of Ireland and as First Lord of the Treasury. On his death, the titles passed to his son, the second Earl. He was a lieutenant-general in the army and served as Lord-Lieutenant of Hertfordshire. He was succeeded by his son, the third Earl. He served as Captain of the Yeomen of the Guard from 1739 to 1743 and was also Lord-Lieutenant of Hertfordshire. When he died the titles passed to his son, the fourth Earl. He also served as Lord-Lieutenant of Hertfordshire.

He was succeeded by his eldest son from his first marriage, the fifth Earl. He sat in the House of Commons for many years and was Lord-Lieutenant of Hertfordshire from 1801 to 1817. Lord Essex assumed the surname of Coningsby. In 1839, at the age of seventy-six, he married the vocalist and actress Catherine Stephens. He was succeeded by his nephew, the sixth Earl. He was the son of the Hon. John Thomas Capell, second son of the fourth Earl from his second marriage to Harriet Bladen. On his death, the titles passed to his grandson, the seventh Earl. He was the eldest son of Lieutenant-Colonel Arthur de Vere Capell, Viscount Malden, eldest son of the sixth Earl. The line of the sixth Earl failed on the death of the seventh Earl's grandson, the ninth Earl, in 1981. The succession was unclear and it was not until 1989 that the late Earl's third cousin once removed, Robert Edward de Vere Capell, managed to prove his claim, and became the tenth Earl. He was the great-grandson of the Hon. Algernon Henry Champagné Capell (younger brother of the sixth Earl), son of the aforementioned the Hon. John Thomas Capell (half-brother of the fifth Earl), son of the second marriage of the fourth Earl.  the titles are held by his only son, the eleventh Earl, who succeeded in 2005.

Two other members of the Capell family have also gained distinction. The Hon. Henry Capell, second son of the first Baron, was a politician and was created Baron Capell of Tewkesbury in 1692. The Hon. Sir Thomas Bladen Capell (1776–1853), youngest son of the second marriage of the fourth Earl, was an admiral in the Royal Navy.

List of Earls of Essex

Earls of Essex, first creation (c. 1139)
 Geoffrey de Mandeville, 1st Earl of Essex (died 1144)
 Geoffrey de Mandeville, 2nd Earl of Essex (died 1166)
 William de Mandeville, 3rd Earl of Essex (died 1189) (extinct)

Earls of Essex, second creation (1199)
 Geoffrey Fitzpeter, 1st Earl of Essex (died 1213)
  Geoffrey FitzGeoffrey de Mandeville, 2nd Earl of Essex (died 1216)
 William FitzGeoffrey de Mandeville, 3rd Earl of Essex (died 1227) (extinct)

Earls of Essex, third creation (1239)
  Humphrey de Bohun, 1st Earl of Essex (died 1275)
 Humphrey de Bohun, 2nd Earl of Essex (died 1298)
 Humphrey de Bohun, 3rd Earl of Essex (died 1322)
 John de Bohun, 4th Earl of Essex (died 1336)
 Humphrey de Bohun, 5th Earl of Essex (1309–1361)
 Humphrey de Bohun, 6th Earl of Essex (1342–1373) (extinct)

Earls of Essex, fourth creation (1376)
  Thomas of Woodstock, Earl of Essex (1355–1397) (forfeit)

Earls of Essex, fifth creation (1461)
  Henry Bourchier, 1st Earl of Essex (died 1483)
 Henry Bourchier, 2nd Earl of Essex (died 1540) (extinct)

Earls of Essex, sixth creation (1540)
  Thomas Cromwell, Earl of Essex (1485–1540) (forfeit)

Earls of Essex, seventh creation (1543)
  William Parr, 1st Marquess of Northampton (c. 1512–1571) (forfeit 1553; restored 1559; extinct 1571)

Earls of Essex, eighth creation (1572)
  Walter Devereux, 1st Earl of Essex (1541–1576)
 Robert Devereux, 2nd Earl of Essex (1566–1601)
 Robert Devereux, 3rd Earl of Essex (1591–1646) (extinct)

Barons Capell of Hadham (1641)
 Arthur Capell, 1st Baron Capell of Hadham (1604–1649)
Arthur Capell, 2nd Baron Capell of Hadham (1631–1683) (created Earl of Essex in 1661)

Earls of Essex, ninth creation (1661)
 Arthur Capell, 1st Earl of Essex (1631–1683)
 Algernon Capell, 2nd Earl of Essex (1670–1710)
 William Capell, 3rd Earl of Essex (1697–1743)
 William Anne Capell, 4th Earl of Essex (1732–1799)
 George Capel-Coningsby, 5th Earl of Essex (1757–1839)
 Arthur Algernon Capell, 6th Earl of Essex (1803–1892)
Arthur de Vere Capell, Viscount Malden (1826–1879)
 George Devereux de Vere Capell, 7th Earl of Essex (1857–1916)
 Algernon George de Vere Capell, 8th Earl of Essex (1884–1966)
 Reginald George de Vere Capell, 9th Earl of Essex (1906–1981) (dormant 1981)
 Robert Edward de Vere Capell, 10th Earl of Essex (1920–2005) (revived 1989)
 (Frederick) Paul de Vere Capell, 11th Earl of Essex (born 1944)

The heir presumptive is the present holder's fourth cousin once-removed William Jennings Capell (born 1952).
The heir presumptive's heir apparent is his only son Kevin Devereux Capell (born 1982)

Family tree

Ancestral seat

At the time of the Capell creation, the Barons Hadham were based at the family seat at Hadham Hall in Little Hadham, Hertfordshire, which was originally purchased in the early 16th century by Sir William Capel, a wealthy draper and Lord Mayor of London. In 1627 his descendant Arthur Capell married Elizabeth Morrison, daughter and heir of Sir Charles Morrison of Cassiobury in Watford. The turmoil of the Civil War took its toll on the Capell family, and Arthur, a Royalist, was executed in 1649. Arthur Capell's eldest son, also called Arthur Capell, inherited both the Hadham and Cassiobury estates. After the Restoration, having been created Viscount Malden and 1st Earl of Essex, the younger Capell became an ambitious courtier of Charles II. Now one of the wealthiest men in England, he embarked on an ambitious project to redecorate Cassiobury House in the style of the sumptuous state rooms of Windsor Castle, hoping to attract a visit from the King to Cassiobury. Although a royal visit was not forthcoming, the 1st Earl's favour for Cassiobury completed the family's move to Watford, and Hadham Hall fell into disuse. The Capell family finally sold Hadham in 1900 and it is now a private residence; Cassiobury remained in the family until 1927 when, like many other British country houses in the period between the world wars, it was demolished.

Notes

References

Kidd, Charles, Williamson, David (editors). Debrett's Peerage and Baronetage (1990 edition). New York: St Martin's Press

External links

 Everything2: Earl of Essex

Earldoms in the Peerage of England
Extinct earldoms in the Peerage of England
!
Earl
Earls of Essex
Forfeited earldoms in the Peerage of England
Noble titles created in 1139
Noble titles created in 1199
Noble titles created in 1239
Noble titles created in 1376
Noble titles created in 1461
Noble titles created in 1540
Noble titles created in 1543
Noble titles created in 1572
Noble titles created in 1661
Peerages created with special remainders
De Mandeville family